Robert Clarke & Company was a book publishing company and bookseller in Cincinnati, Ohio from 1858 to 1909. After 1894, it was known as The Robert Clarke Company. It published literary and historical works.

Leadership
Robert Clarke was born May 1, 1829 at Annan,
Dumfrieshire, Scotland, and came with his parents to Cincinnati, Ohio in 1840. He was educated at public schools and Woodward College. He was a bookkeeper for William Hanna, and then became a proprietor of a second-hand bookstore near the corner of 6th and Walnut St. In 1858, in partnership with John W. Dale and Roderick D. Barney, he bought out the large Cincinnati publishing and bookjobbing firm H. W. Derby & Co., renaming it Robert Clarke & Co. In 1874, Howard Barney and Alexander Hill entered the firm.

In 1894, the firm was renamed The Robert Clarke Company with a board composed of the same gentlemen. Robert Clarke died at his home library in Glendale, Ohio on August 27, 1899. The firm lost its plant in a February, 1903 fire, but rebuilt. The firm dissolved in a receiver's sale in 1909.

Reputation
The firm's reputation for access to comprehensive offerings is illustrated by the following testimonials:

Selected publications

 - two volumes
 - two volumes

Notes

References

Further reading

Book publishing companies based in Ohio
Defunct book publishing companies of the United States
Publishing companies established in 1858
History of Cincinnati
1858 establishments in Ohio